Rivers are ordered alphabetically, by state. The same river may be found in more than one state as many rivers cross state borders.

Longest rivers nationally

Longest river by state or territory
Although the Murray River forms much of the border separating New South Wales and Victoria, it is not Victoria's longest river because the New South Wales border is delineated by the river's southern bank rather than by the middle of the river. The only section of the river formally within Victoria is a stretch of approximately  where it separates Victoria and South Australia. At this point, the middle of the river forms the border.

Rivers by state or territory
The following is a list of rivers located within Australian states and territories. Where a river crosses a state or territory boundary, it is listed in both states and territories. Where a river has a name that includes the word creek, it has been officially designated as a river.

Australian Capital Territory

 Rivers of the Australian Capital Territory template
 Blue Gum
 Cotter
 Gibraltar
 Ginninderra
 Gudgenby
 Jerrabomberra
 Molonglo
 Murrumbidgee
 Naas
 Orroral
 Paddys
 Punchbowl
 Queanbeyan
 Sullivans
 Tuggeranong

New South Wales

The Geographical Names Board of New South Wales lists 439 rivers in the Geographical Names Register. In the following list, where there are duplicated names, the source local government area (LGA) is identified. In the event of there being two rivers of the same name within the same local government area, additional referencing is provided. Rivers of New South Wales lists all rivers below, grouped according to whether the river flows towards the coast or flow inland, and grouped according to their respective catchment and sub-catchment. Where shown in italics, the watercourse is a creek, rivulet, brook, or similar.

 Rivers of New South Wales template
 Waterways of Sydney template
A
 Abercrombie
 Aberfoyle
 Abington
 Adelong
 Adjungbilly
 Allyn
 Apsley
 Araluen
 Avon (source in Wollongong LGA)
 Avon (source in Mid-Coast Council LGA)
B
 Back (source in Richmond Valley LGA)
 Back (source in Cooma-Monaro LGA)
 Back (source in Tamworth Regional LGA)
 Baerami
 Bakers
 Balgalal
 Barcoongere
 Bargo
 Barigan
 Barmedman
 Barnard
 Barrington
 Barwon
 Beardy
 Beardy Waters
 Beaury
 Bedford
 Bega
 Bell
 Bellinger
 Belubula
 Bemboka
 Bendoc
 Bermagui
 Berthong
 Bettowynd
 Bielsdown
 Big Badja
 Billabong
 Bimberamala
 Birrie
 Blackwater
 Blakney
 Bland
 Blicks
 Blue Mountain
 Bluff
 Bobin
 Bobo
 Bogan
 Bokhara
 Bolong
 Bombala
 Boomi
 Boonoo Boonoo
 Boorowa
 Boundary (source in Clarence Valley LGA, a tributary of the Glen Fernaigh River)
 Boundary (source in Clarence Valley LGA, a tributary of the Nymboida River)
 Bow
 Bowman
 Bowning
 Boyd
 Bredbo
 Brogo
 Brunswick
 Buckenbowra
 Bulla
 Bundock
 Bunnoo
 Burke
 Burkes
 Burns
 Burra (source in Palerang LGA)
 Burra (source in Gundagai LGA)
 Burrungubugge
 Bylong
C
 Cadiangullong
 Camden Haven
 Campbells
 Caparra
 Capertee
 Carole
 Castlereagh
 Cataract (source in Tenterfield LGA)
 Cataract (source in Wollondilly LGA)
 Cattle Creek
 Cedar
 Cedar Party
 Cells
 Chandler
 Chandlers
 Cheshire
 Chichester
 Christmas
 Clarence
 Clouds
 Clyde
 Cobark
 Cobrabald
 Cockburn
 Coldstream
 Colo
 Commissioners Waters
 Congewai
 Connollys
 Cooba Bulga
 Cooks
 Cooks Vale
 Coolaburragundy
 Coolibah
 Coolongolook
 Coolumbooka
 Cooma Back
 Cooma
 Coopers
 Cooplacurripa
 Coorongooba
 Corang
 Cordeaux
 Corindi
 Cowriga
 Coxs
 Crawford
 Crookwell
 Crudine
 Cudgegong
 Culgoa
 Cullinga
 Cunningham
 Curricabark
D
 Darling
 Great Darling Anabranch
 Dawson
 Deepwater
 Delegate
 Derringullen
 Deua
 Dilgry
 Dingo
 Doubtful
 Doyles
 Dry
 Du Faur
 Duckmaloi
 Dumaresq
 Dungowan
 Dyke
E
 Eden
 Edward
 Ellenborough
 Emu Swamp
 Endrick
 Erskine
 Esk
 Eucumbene
 Evans Plains
 Evans
 Ewenmar
F
 Felled Timber
 Fish
 Flyers
 Forbes
 Frenchmans
 Frazers
G
 Gara
 Geehi
 Genoa
 Georges
 Georges
 Glen Fernaigh
 Gloucester
 Goobarragandra
 Goodradigbee
 Goorudee
 Goulburn
 Grose
 Growee
 Gungarlin
 Gunningbland
 Guy Fawkes
 Gwydir
H
 Hacking
 Halls
 Happy Jacks
 Hastings
 Hawkesbury
 Henry
 Hollanders
 Horsearm
 Horton
 Hunter
I
 Imlay
 Ingeegoodbee
 Isabella
 Isis
J
 Jacobs
 Jeir
 Jenolan
 Jerra Jerra
 Jerrabattgulla
 Jerrara
 Jerrawa
 Jooriland
 Jugiong
K
 Kalang
 Kanangra
 Kangaroo (source in Clarence Valley LGA)
 Kangaroo (source in Shoalhaven LGA)
 Karuah
 Kedumba
 Kerripit
 Kindra
 Kowmung
 Krui
 Kunderang
 Kybeyan
L
 Lachlan
 Lane Cove
 Lansdowne
 Lee
 Leycester
 Little Murray
 Little Nymboida
 Little Plains
 Little (source in Wollondilly LGA)
 Little (source in Dubbo LGA)
 Little (source in Oberon LGA)
 Little (source in Wingecarribee LGA)
 Little Run
 Little Weir
 Lennox River (proposed name)
M
 Macdonald (source in Tamworth LGA)
 Macdonald (source in Singleton LGA)
 Macintyre
 Maclaughlin
 Macleay
 Macquarie
 Macquarie
 Mammy Johnsons
 Mangrove
 Mann
 Manning
 Maria
 Maryland
 Medway
 Mehi
 Meroo
 Merrica
 Merriwa
 Middle
 Minnamurra
 Mirrool
 Mogo
 Mole
 Molonglo
 Mongarlowe
 Moonan
 Mooney Mooney
 Mooki
 Mooni
 Moppy
 Moredun
 Moruya
 Mowamba
 Mulga
 Mulla Mulla
 Mulwaree
 Mummel
 Munmurra
 Murrah
 Murray
 Murruin
 Murrumbidgee
 Myall
N
 Nadgee
 Nadgigomar
 Nambucca
 Namoi
 nangahrah
 Narran
 Nattai
 Nepean
 Never Never
 Niemur
 Nowendoc
 Nowlands
 Nullica
 Numeralla
 Nunnock
 Nymboida
O
 Oaky
 Oban
 O'Briens
 Orara
 Ourimbah
 Oxley
P
 Paddys (source in Wingecarribee LGA)
 Paddys (source in Tumbarumba LGA)
 Pages
 Pages
 Pambula
 Pappinbarra
 Parma
 Paroo
 Parramatta
 Paterson
 Peak
 Peel (A Section Of)
 Peel
 Peelwood
 Phils
 Pigna Barney
 Pinch
 Pinchgut
 Pipers Creek
 Pudman
Q
 Queanbeyan
 Queen Charlottes
 Queens Pound
 Queensborough
 Quegobla
 Quirindi
R
 Ralfes
 Reedy
 Retreat
 Richmond
 River Lett
 Rock Flat
 Rocky Ponds
 Rocky
 Rosewood
 Rouchel
 Rous
 Rowleys
 Rufus
 Rush
S
 Sandon
 Sandy (source in Bland LGA)
 Sandy (source in Cobar LGA)
 Sandy (source in Richmond Valley LGA)
 Sandy (source in Tamworth Regional LGA)
 Sara
 Severn
 Sewells
 Shannon
 Shoalhaven
 Snowy
 Stewarts
 Stewarts
 Strike-a-Light
 Styx
 Summer Hill
 Swampy Plain
T
 Tabulam
 Talbragar
 Tallawudjah
 Tallowa
 Tarcutta
 Tarlo
 Tarrion
 Taylors Arm
 Telegherry
 Terania
 The Big Warrambool
 The Branch
 Thompsons
 Thone
 Thredbo
 Tia
 Tilbuster
 Timbarra
 Tindarey
 Tobins
 Tomaga
 Tonalli
 Tooloom
 Tooma
 Towallum
 Towamba
 Trigalong
 Tuglow
 Tumut
 Turners
 Turon
 Tuross
 Tweed
U
 Undowah
 Upsalls
 Urumbilum
W
 Wadbilliga
 Wah Way
 Walcrow
 Wallagaraugh
 Wallamba
 Wallingat
 Wang Wauk
 Wangat
 Warbro
 Wards
 Warialda
 Warnes
 Warragamba
 Warrego
 Warrell
 Watagan
 Webbs
 Werong
 Werriberri
 Wheeny
 Wheeo
 Whitbarrow
 White Rock
 Widden
 Wild Cattle Williams
 Williwa Wilson
 Wilsons
 Winburndale Wingecarribee
 Wog Wog
 Wolgan
 Wollangambe
 Wollemi Wollombi Wollomombi
 Wollondilly
 Wonboyn
 Wooli Wooli
 Worondi Woronora
 Wyong
Y
 Yadboro
 Yancowinna Yanda Yango Yarrabandai Yarramanbah Yarrangobilly
 Yarrow
 Yarrowitch
 Yarrunga Yass
 Yowaka
 Yowrie

Northern Territory

Rivers of the Northern Territory template
 Adelaide
 Alligator Rivers
 East Alligator
 South Alligator
 West Alligator
 Buckingham
 Blackmore
 Blyth
 Calvert
 Daly
 Douglas
 Dry
 Elizabeth
 Finke
 Fish
 Fitzmaurice
 Georgina
 Goomadeer
 Goromuru
 Goyder
 Gregory
 Hale
 Hay
 Hodgson
 Johnson
 Katherine
 Keep
 King
 Koolatong
 Limmen Bight
 Liverpool
 MacKinley
 Mary
 Moyle
 McArthur
 Negri
 Nicholson
 Palmer
 Playford
 Plenty
 Robinson
 Roper
 Rosie
 Sandover
 Settlement Todd
 Towns
 Victoria
 Walker
 Wearyan
 Wickham
 Wildman
 Wilton

Queensland

 Rivers of Queensland template
 Waterways of Brisbane template
A
 Albert
 Alice
 Annan
 Archer
B
 Baffle Balonne
 Banksia Barcoo
 Barratta Barron
 Barwon
 Basalt
 Belyando
 Black
 Bloomfield
 Bohle
 Boomi
 Bokhara
 Bowen
 Boyne (Central Queensland)
 Boyne (Wide Bay–Burnett)
 Bremer
 Brisbane
 Broken
 Bulimba Bungil Burdekin
 Burke
 Burnett
 Burrum
C
 Caboolture
 Calliope
 Campaspe
 Carpentier
 Clara
 Cliffdale Coen
 Coleman
 Comet
 Condamine
 Connors
 Coomera
 Cooper Crystal Currumbin Culgoa
D
 Daintree
 Dawson
 Dee
 Diamantina
 Don
 Ducie
 Dumaresq
E
 Edward
 Elliott
 Embley
 Endeavour
 Enoggera Eprapah Esk
F
 Flinders
 Fitzroy

G
 Georgina
 Gilbert-Einasleigh
 Gilliat
 Gregory
H
 Hann
 Haughton
 Herbert

 Holroyd
I
 Isaac
 Isis
 IthacaJ
 Jackey Jackey Jardine
 Jeannie
 Johnstone
K
 Kedron Kendall
 Kolan
L
 Langlo
 Laura
 Leichhardt
 Lockhart
 Lockyer Loders Logan
 Lynd
M
 Mackenzie
 Maranoa
 Maroochy
 Mary
 Mcdonald
 Merivale
 Mission
 Mitchell
 Moggill Mooloolah
 Moonie
 Mossman
 Mulgrave

N
 Nerang
 Nicholson
 Nive
 Nogoa
 Norman
 Norman Normanby
 Noosa
 North Pine
O
 O'Connell
 Olive
 OxleyP
 Palmer
 Paroo
 Pascoe
 Pennefather
 Pike Pimpama
 Pine
 Pioneer
 Proserpine
R
 Ross
 Russell
S
 Sandover
 Saxby
 Settlement Severn
 South Pine
 Staaten
 Stanley
 Stuart
 Stewart
 Styx
 Susan
 Suttor
T
 Tallebudgera Tate
 Thomson
 Tingalpa Tully
W
 Walsh
 Wanggoolba Warrego
 Ward
 Ward
 Waterpark Watson

 Weir
 Wenlock

Wilson
Y
 Yappar

South Australia

 Rivers of South Australia template
 Acraman
 Alberga
 Anacotilla
 Angas
 Breakneck
 Bremer
 Broughton
 Bungala
 Chapman
 Congeratinga
 Cooper Crystal Brook Currency Cygnet
 De Mole
 Diamantina
 Eleanor
 Eyre Field
 Finniss
 Finke
 Frome
 Gawler
 Georgina
 Gilbert
 Glenelg
 Harriet
 Hill
 Hindmarsh
 Hutt
 Inman
 Jacobs Kallakoopah Light
 Little Para
 Macumba
 Marne
 Middle
 Murray
 Myponga
 Neales
 North Para
 North West
 Officer Onkaparinga
 Panalatinga Parananacooka
 Patawalonga
 Port
 Rocky (Kangaroo Island)
 Rocky (Mid North)
 Sandy
 Siccus
 South Para
 South West
 Strzelecki Stun Sail Boom
 Sturt
 Tod
 Torrens
 Wakefield
 Warburton
 Western
 Willson
 Yankalilla
 Yattagolinga

Tasmania

 Rivers of Tasmania template
 Adams
 Andrew
 Anne
 Anthony
 Apsley
 Arm
 Arthur
 Arve
 Badger
 Black
 Black Bobs
 Blackman
 Blythe
 Boyd
 Break O'Day
 Bream Broad
 Browns
 Cam
 Cascade
 Clyde
 Coal
 Cockle Collingwood
 Craycroft
 Crayfish Davey
 Dee
 Denison
 Derwent
 Don
 Donaldson
 Dover
 Duck
 Elizabeth
 Emu
 Esperance
 Florentine
Flowerdale
 Forth
 Franklin
 Gordon
 Great Forester
 Hellyer
 Henty
 Hobart''
 Holley
 Huon
 Inglis
 Isis
 James
 Jane
 Jordan
 King
 Lea
 Leven
 Liffey
 Little Swanport
 Lune
 Mackintosh
 Macquarie
 Meander
 Mersey
 Murchison
 Nile
 Nive
 North Esk
 Ouse
 Picton
 Pieman
 Pipers
 Pokana
 Queen
 Ringarooma
 Ringarooma (Lower)
 Rubicon
 Savage
 Serpentine
 Shannon
 Sophia
 South Esk
 Spero
 Styx
 Swan
 Tamar
 Tooms
 Tully
 Tyne
 Vale
 Weld
 Wye
 Yolande

Victoria

 Rivers of Victoria template
 Waterways of Melbourne template
A
 Aberfeldy
 Acheron
 Ada (Baw Baw)
 Ada (East Gippsland)
 Agnes
 Aire
 Albert
 Anglesea
 Arte
 Avoca
 Avon (Gippsland)
 Avon (Grampians)
B
 Barham
 Barkly
 Barwon
 Bass
 Bemm
 Bendoc
 Benedore
 Berrima
 Betka
 Big (Brodribb)
 Big (Goulburn)
 Big (Mitta Mitta)
 Black
 Bonang
 Brodribb
 Broken
 Buchan
 Buckland
 Buffalo
 Bundara
 Bunyip
C
 Calder
 Caledonia
 Campaspe
 Cann
 Cann River East
 Carlisle
 Catherine
 Chetwynd
 Cobungra
 Coliban
 Combienbar
 Crawford
 Crooked
 Cumberland
 Curdies
D
 Dandongadale
 Darby
 Dargo
 Darlot Creek
 Dart
 Deddick
 Delatite
 Delegate
 Don
 Dry
 Dundas
E
 Elliott
 Errinundra
 Eumeralla
F
 Fitzroy
 Ford
 Franklin
G
 Geary
 Gellibrand
 Genoa
 Gibbo
 Glenelg
 Goolengook
 Goulburn
 Grey
H
 Hartland
 Hopkins
 Howqua
 Humffray
I
 Ingeegoodbee
J
 Jack (East Gippsland)
 Jack (Wellington)
 Jamieson
 Johanna
 Jordan
K
 Kennet
 Kiewa
 King
L
 Lang Lang
 Latrobe
 Leigh
 Lerderderg
 Little (Avon)
 Little (Cathedral Range)
 Little (Greater Geelong)
 Little (Moroka)
 Little (Snowy River NP)
 Little (Sydenham Inlet)
 Little (Tambo)
 Little Arte
 Little Coliban
 Little Dargo
 Little Goolengook
 Little Murray
 Little Rubicon
 Little Yalmy
 Little Yarra
 Loch
 Loddon
M
 Macalister
 MacKenzie
 McKenzie
 Maribyrnong
 Merri
 Mitchell
 Mitta Mitta
 Moe
 Moroka
 Moorabool
 Mount Emu Creek
 Morwell
 Moyne
 Mueller
 Murray
 Murrindal
 Murrindindi
N
 Nicholson
O
 Ovens
 O'Shannassy
P
 Patterson
 Parker
 Perry
 Plenty
 Powlett
Q
 Queensborough
R
 Red
 Rich
 Richardson
 Rocky
 Rodger
 Rose
 Royston
 Rubicon
S
 Saint Patricks
 St George
 Shaw
 Snowy
 Steavenson
 Stokes
 Suggan Buggan
 Surrey
T
 Taggerty
 Tambo
 Tanjil
 Taponga
 Tarago
 Tarra
 Tarwin
 The Old
 Thomson
 Thurra
 Tidal
 Timbarra
 Toorongo
 Turton
 Tyers
V
 Victoria
W
 Wallagaraugh
 Wando
 Wannon
 Watts
 Wellington
 Wentworth
 Werribee
 Wimmera
 Wingan
 Woady Yaloak
 Wonnangatta
 Wongungarra
 Wye
Y
 Yalmy
 Yarra
 Yarrowee
 Yea
 Yeerung

Western Australia

A
 Abba
 Adcock
 Alexander
 Angelo
 Angove
 Armanda
 Arrowsmith
 Arthur
 Ashburton
 Avon
B
 Balgarup
 Balla Balla
 Bannister
 Barker
 Barnett
 Barton
 Beasley
 Beaufort
 Behn
 Berckelman
 Berkeley
 Blackwood
 Bow (southern Western Australia)
 Bow (northern Western Australia)
 Bowes
 Bremer
 Brockman
 Brunswick
 Buayanyup
 Buchanan
 Buller
C
 Calder
 Cane
 Canning
 Capel
 Carbunup
 Carson
 Chamberlain
 Chapman
 Charnley
 Collie
 Coongan
D
 Dale
 Dalyup
 Dandalup
 De Grey
 Deep
 Denmark
 Donnelly
 Drysdale
 Dunham
 Durack
E
 Edmund
 Elvire
 Ernest
 Eyre
F
 Ferguson
 Fitzgerald
 Fitzroy
 Forrest
 Fortescue
 Frankland
 Fraser
 Frederick
G
 Gairdner (southern Western Australia)
 Gairdner (northern Western Australia)
 Gascoyne
 Gibb
 Glenelg
 Goodga
 Gordon
 Greenough
H
 Hamersley
 Hann
 Hardey
 Harding
 Harvey
 Hay
 Helena
 Henry
 Hill

 Hope
 Hotham
 Hunter
 Hutt
I
 Impey
 Irwin
 Isdell
J
 Jerdacuttup
 Johnston
K
 Kalgan
 Kent
 King Edward
 King George
 King (northern Western Australia)
 King (southern Western Australia)
L
 Landor
 Laur
 Lockhart
 Lennard
 Lort
 Ludlow
 Lyons
M
 Mackie
 Maitland
 Margaret (northern Western Australia)
 Margaret (southern Western Australia)
 Mary
 May
 McRae
 Meda
 Minilya
 Mitchell
 Moore
 Mortlock
 Munglinup
 Murchison
 Murray
N
 Nambung
 Negri
 Nicholson
 Nullagine
O
 Oakover
 Oldfield
 Ord
P
 Pallinup
 Panton
 Pentecost
 Phillips
 Preston
 Prince Regent
R
 Richenda
 Robe
 Robinson
 Roe
 Rudall
S
 Sabina
 Sale
 Salt
 Serpentine
 Shannon
 Shaw
 Sherlock
 South Dandalup
 Steere
 Swan
T
 Thomas
 Tone
 Turner
V
 Vasse
W
 Walpole
 Warren
 Waychinicup
 Weld
 Williams
 Wilson
 Wooramel
Y
 Yalgar
 Young
 Yule

See also

 List of rivers
 List of drainage basins of Australia
 List of valleys of Australia

References

External links